The Altay class, Soviet designation Project 160, is a class of replenishment oiler built for the Soviet Navy between 1967 and 1972.

Construction
The Altay-class vessels were built for the USSR by the Finnish shipbuilding yard Rauma-Repola. Over 60 vessels of this type were built for Soviet service, most with the fishing fleet and merchant fleet. Only six vessels were ordered for service with the Soviet Navy. Project 160 tankers can refuel one ship at a time from either side or over the stern.

Operational history

1993 Yel'nya incident
In April 1993, while in reserve with the Black Sea Fleet at Sevastopol, Yel'nya was taken over by Ukrainian dissidents. After a brief seizure, control was reestablished by the Russian Navy. Yel'nya was later transferred to the Baltic Fleet.

2021 Kola Gulf of Suez collision and Suez Canal obstruction 

On 23 March 2021, Kola, along with Steregushchiy-class corvette Stoikiy, were in the northern part of the Gulf of Suez when Kola collided with civilian bulk carrier Ark Royal. The two ships, which were both approaching Suez, sustained light damage, according to the Russian Navy. Kola and Ark Royal resumed sailing after the collision.

That same day, Kola and Stoikiy were in the Gulf of Suez when the container ship Ever Given ran aground in the Suez Canal, completely obstructing the canal. Kola, along with Stoikiy and around 350 other ships on both sides of the canal, were forced to wait for the Ever Given to be refloated. Initially, Kola and Stoikiy were the only known military vessels to have been affected by the obstruction, however since normally military ships do not transmit their position to commercial websites, an unknown number of military ships were involved, with the Spanish amphibious assault ship Juan Carlos I being among the first ships to move through the canal. At the time of the incident, maritime tracking website vesselfinder.com temporarily misidentified Kola as Stoikiy (specifically "Russian Warship 545"); this was corrected on 25 March. As of 29 March, Kola was still anchored in the Gulf of Suez.

Ships in class
There were six vessels in the class.

References

External links
 Project 160 medium seagoing tanker (English)

Cold War naval ships of the Soviet Union
Oilers
Ships built in Finland
Auxiliary ships of the Soviet Navy
Auxiliary replenishment ship classes